Rancho La Liebre was a   Mexican land grant in present-day Kern County, California and Los Angeles County, given in 1846 by Governor Pío Pico to José María Flores.  Liebre means "Hare" in Spanish and the rancho was named as such because of the abundance of jack rabbits in the area.

The rancho was mostly in the mountainous terrain of the Tehachapi Mountains and Sierra Pelona Mountains, in the northwest part of Los Angeles County, west of the Antelope Valley and Mojave Desert.  The rancho is now a part of the  Tejon Ranch.

History
Flores was the commander and chief of the Mexican forces in California during the Mexican-American War.

With the cession of California to the United States following the Mexican-American War, the 1848 Treaty of Guadalupe Hidalgo provided that the land grants would be honored.  Flores nearly lost his entitlement to the rancho when the Public Land Commission declared the grant to be fraudulently obtained.  The Land Commission contended that Pico back dated many of the land grants he issued and that Rancho La Liebre was granted while California was under American control and no longer a part of Mexico.  However, Flores won an appeal and kept the title.  The grant was patented to Jose Maria Flores in 1875.

In 1855 Edward Beale purchased Rancho La  Liebre from Flores.  It was the first of the four Mexican Land Grants (Rancho Los Alamos y Agua Caliente, Rancho El Tejon, and Rancho Castac) that Beale would acquire to create the present Tejon Ranch.

Historic sites of the Rancho
La Casa del Rancho La Liebre is the adobe built by Edward F. Beale in the late 1850s in Bear Canyon (Canon de las Osas). By the time Beale acquired La Liebre, he had married Mary Edwards and had a son named Truxtun.  The house was the administrative headquarters for the  nearly of ranch land that expanded over both Los Angeles and Kern Counties.  It is a half mile south of State Route 138, approximately ten miles east of Interstate 5.

See also
Ranchos of California
List of Ranchos of California

References

External links
USC Digital Library: Map of old Spanish and Mexican ranchos in Los Angeles County

 

Liebre, La
Liebre
La Liebre
Antelope Valley
Sierra Pelona Ridge
Tehachapi Mountains
Mountain Communities of the Tejon Pass
La Liebre